The following highways are numbered 740:

Ireland
 R740 regional road

United States